The Chicago Board of Education is led by a president. The current President of the Chicago Board of Education is Miguel del Valle.

Since the 1995 Chicago School Reform Amendatory Act went into effect, the president has been directly appointed by the mayor of Chicago, rather than being elected among the members of the board.

Beginning with the 2026 Chicago Board of Education elections, after which the Board of Education is slated to become an entirely-elected board, the president will be elected at-large. It will be one of four at-large citywide elected offices in Chicago (alongside the mayor of Chicago, city clerk of Chicago, and city treasurer of Chicago).

Officeholders

Chairmen of the Chicago Board of School Inspectors (1840–1857)
Until 1857, the head of the school board was known as the "chairman of the Chicago Board of School Inspectors" Written records of the board prior to 1840 are incomplete.

Presidents of the Chicago Board of Education (1857–1995)

Chairmen of the School Reform Board of Trustees (1995–1999)

Presidents of the Chicago Board of Education (1999–present)

References